Southwest Virginia Community College (SWCC) is a public community college in Cedar Bluff.  It is part of the Virginia Community College System. SWCC was opened in 1968 to serve the residents of Buchanan, Russell and Tazewell counties, as well as portions of Dickenson County.

Presidents
 Dr. Tommy F. Wright (January 8, 2018 - present)
 Dr. J. Mark Estepp (July 2, 2007 – January 7, 2018 )
 Dr. William Snyder (interim president for the college while a search for Dr. King's replacement was conducted)
 Dr. Charles R. King (founding president, retired in December 2006)

Campus facilities
 Buchanan Hall
 Tazewell Hall
 Russell Hall
 Dickenson Hall
 Ralph B. Davis Hall
 Dellinger Hall
 Charles R. King Community Center
 Physical Plant
 National Guard Armory
 Soccer field and track
 Baseball field
 Tennis Courts
 Walking Trail
 Campus Bookstore

Notable alumni
 Jayma Mays (graduate) - An American actress and singer. She starred as Emma Pillsbury on the Fox musical series Glee.  She had a recurring role as Charlie Andrews on the NBC sci-fi serial Heroes. She starred, opposite of Kevin James, in The Smurfs and Paul Blart: Mall Cop. In 2013 - 2014, she also played the role of Debbie on The Millers, a sitcom.  Mays has starred as prosecutor Carol Anne Keane in the NBC sitcom Trial & Error, since early in 2017. In 2018, Mays guest stars in season two of Great News, as Cat, Greg's girlfriend.
 Sean Spencer (attended) - professional mixed martial artist, current UFC welterweight

References

External links
 Official website

Virginia Community College System
Education in Buchanan County, Virginia
Universities and colleges accredited by the Southern Association of Colleges and Schools
Education in Tazewell County, Virginia
Buildings and structures in Tazewell County, Virginia
Southwest Virginia
Educational institutions established in 1968
1968 establishments in Virginia